The 2014 CollegeInsider.com Postseason Tournament (CIT) was a postseason single-elimination tournament of 32 NCAA Division I teams. The first round started March 17, 2014. The semifinals were played on April 1, with the championship game played on April 3, 2014.

32 participants who belong to "mid-major" conferences and were not invited to the 2014 NCAA Tournament, the 2014 National Invitation Tournament (NIT), or the 2014 College Basketball Invitational (CBI) made up the field.

The first three rounds were streamed online through the Collegeinsider.com platform powered by NeuLion. Free registration was required to view the games. Both semifinals and the CIT championship game, were televised on CBS Sports Network

In the championship game, the Murray State Racers defeated the Yale Bulldogs  65–57 in front of a crowd of 4,467 at Murray State's CFSB Center.

Participating teams
The following teams received an invitation to the 2014 CIT:

Format
The sixth annual CIT again used the former NIT model in which match-ups in each round were re-seeded based on the results of the previous round.

Schedule

Source: www.collegeinsider.com

Bracket
Bracket is for visual purposes only. The CIT does not have a set bracket.

Home teams are listed second.

References

External links
 CIT 2014 Guide

CollegeInsider.com
CollegeInsider.com Postseason Tournament